The Board of Trustees  of the British Museum comprises up to 25 members. One trustee is appointed by The Crown, 15 are appointed by the Prime Minister and five appointed by the trustees. Four trustees are appointed by the Secretary of State for Culture, Media and Sport on the nominations of the Presidents of the Royal Academy, the British Academy, the Society of Antiquaries of London and the Royal Society. The current Chair is George Osborne.

Current trustees
The following is a list of current trustees, as of Feb 2021. Trustees are usually appointed for an initial term of four years. Appointments can be renewed with the Prime Minister’s approval, but trustees can only serve for a maximum of 10 years.

Prof. Abhijit Banerjee
Prof. Dame Mary Beard DBE, FSA, FBA
Dame Elizabeth Corley DBE
Clarissa Farr
Prof. Chris Gosden FBA
Muriel Gray FRSE (Deputy Chair)
Philipp Hildebrand
Dame Vivian Hunt DBE
Jonathan Marland, Baron Marland
Sir Charlie Mayfield
George Osborne CH (Chair)
Mark Pears CBE
Grayson Perry CBE, RA
Sir Paul Ruddock FSA
Minouche Shafik, Baroness Shafik DBE (Deputy Chair)
Priyanka Wadhawan
Prof. Sir Mark Walport FRCP, FRS, FMedSci, HonFRSE
George Weston
Prof. Dame Sarah Worthington DBE, QC (Hon), FBA

Resignation of Adhaf Souief
Egyptian novelist Ahdaf Soueif resigned from the board in 2019, citing issues with "corporate sponsorship" by BP as well as the Museum's refusal to repatriate artifacts such as the Parthenon Marbles which she felt should have been repatriated.  The resignation was supported by staff members at the British Museum, who were reported by the Guardian to "expressed support" for Soueif. In a 2018 article for the Guardian, Lambert stated that the Elgin Marbles should remain in the museum and opposed their repatriation to the Greek government.

Former trustees
The 1753 British Museum Act established a 42 strong Board of Trustees, which included two representatives each of the Sloane, Cotton, and Harley families, elected representatives and the following ex-officio: Archbishop of Canterbury, Lord Chancellor, Speaker of the House of Commons, Lord President of the Council, First Lord of the Treasury, Lord Privy Seal, Lord High Admiral, Lord Steward, Lord Chamberlain, the three Principal Secretaries of State, Bishop of London, Chancellor of the Exchequer, Lord Chief Justice King's Bench, Master of the Rolls, Lord Chief Justice Common Pleas, Attorney General, and Solicitor General.

This rose to 50 by the mid-1800s, including the addition of a trustee appointed by the Crown (1832 British Museum Act) and one representative each from the Towneley, Elgin, and Knight families.

The British Museum Act 1963 reduced the number of trustees to the current 25 and set the time-limit on appointments.

Former trustees from 1963 onwards

Emeka Anyaoku
John Addis
Noel Annan, Baron Annan
Heneage Finch, 4th Earl of Aylesford
Lord Broers of Cambridge
 T. S. R. Boase
 John Boyd
 Barry Cunliffe (2000–2005)
Edward Boyle, Baron Boyle of Handsworth
Alec Broers, Baron Broers
Ronald Cohen
Francis Finlay
Val Gooding
Stephen Green
Bonnie Greer
James Lindsay, 26th Earl of Crawford
Edward Thomas Hall
William Hayter (diplomat)
Penny Hughes
Olga Kennard
John Kendrew
Baroness Kennedy of the Shaws
Peter Lasko
Austen Henry Layard
Richard Lambert
Edmée P Leventis
David Norgrove
Amartya Sen
Vikram Seth
Lord Powell of Bayswater
Philip Stanhope, 5th Earl Stanhope
Sir Richard Thompson, 1st Baronet
George Townshend, 2nd Marquess Townshend
Arnold Weinstock (1985–1996)
G. M. Young

Notable former trustees 1753–1963
Given the large number of ex-officio and family representatives, this list will only include those trustees who are notable for their work with regard to the British Museum.
Joseph Banks (1788–1820) ex-officio as president of the Royal Society
Clayton Mordaunt Cracherode (1730–1799), trustee 1784–1799, a major collector of prints and books, who left his important collections to the museum.

References 

Briti